Sahagún is a town and municipality located in the Córdoba Department, northern Colombia.

Climate

References

 Gobernacion de Cordoba - Sahagún
 Sahagún official website

Municipalities of Córdoba Department